James Butler Milliken (August 7, 1900 – August 11, 1988) was an American jurist and Democratic politician who served as a judge of the Kentucky Court of Appeals for 24 years from 1951 to 1975. During his period of service, the Court of Appeals was the highest court in Kentucky. The Kentucky Supreme Court was not created until 1975, the year Milliken retired. He served three terms as chief justice, 1956–57, 1963–64 and, 1971–73.

Milliken was born in Louisville, Kentucky in 1900, grew up in Bellevue, Kentucky and graduated from Centre College where he was a member of Phi Kappa Tau fraternity. He graduated from Yale Law School in 1926. After two years at Yale, he returned home to teach math and English at Dayton (Kentucky) High School where he was also coach of the basketball team. In addition to teaching and coaching, he attended classes at the University of Cincinnati College of Law, eventually returning to Yale to graduate. He began his practice of law in Cincinnati and Campbell County, Kentucky where he became city attorney of Southgate, Kentucky. He later became a Kentucky State Representative and served as Chairman of the Kentucky Workers Compensation Board.

During his tenure on the Court of Appeals, Milliken was an advocate for judicial reform and modernization. He was instrumental in bringing about a judicial retirement system in Kentucky and in the formation of the Kentucky Supreme Court.

After his retirement from the bench on January 6, 1975, he taught constitutional law at the Salmon P. Chase College of Law and was given Chase's Distinguished Service Award.

References
James B. Milliken's obituary

Centre College alumni
Politicians from Louisville, Kentucky
1900 births
1988 deaths
Democratic Party members of the Kentucky House of Representatives
Judges of the Kentucky Court of Appeals
Salmon P. Chase College of Law faculty
20th-century American judges
20th-century American politicians